National Highway 340C, commonly called NH 340C is a national highway in  India. It is a spur road of National Highway 40.  NH-340C traverses the state of Andhra Pradesh in India.

Route 
Kurnool, Nandikotkur, Atmakur, Dornala.

Junctions  
 
  Terminal near Kurnool.
  Terminal near Dornala.

See also 
 List of National Highways in India
 List of National Highways in India by state

References

External links 

 NH 340C on OpenStreetMap

National highways in India
National Highways in Andhra Pradesh